Air Commodore Lionel Evelyn Oswald Charlton,  (7 July 1879 – 18 April 1958) was a British infantry officer who served in the Second Boer War.  During the First World War, Charlton held several command and staff posts in the Royal Flying Corps, finishing the war as a brigadier general. Transferring to the Royal Air Force on its creation, Charlton served in several air officer posts until his retirement from the air force in 1928. Most notably, Charlton resigned his position as the RAF's Chief Staff Officer in Iraq as he objected to the bombing of Iraqi villages.

Early life
Lionel Charlton was born on 7 July 1879 at Piccadilly in London. He was educated at Brighton College and was commissioned a second lieutenant in the Lancashire Fusiliers on 28 September 1898, followed by promotion to lieutenant on 1 September 1899.

He served with the 2nd Battalion of his regiment in the Second Boer War 1899–1901, including as part of the Ladysmith Relief Force, and was severely wounded at the battle of Spion Kop, for which he received the Distinguished Service Order (DSO). He was promoted captain on 5 October 1901. During the latter part of the war he served with the 3rd Battalion Imperial Yeomanry, and returned home with the other officers and men of this battalion in the SS Kinfauns Castle leaving Cape Town in early August 1902, after the war had ended. Following their return, he relinquished his commission with the Imperial Yeomanry in September 1902, and returned to the Lancashire Fusiliers. He did not stay long, however, as later the same year he was seconded to serve with the Gold Coast Regiment.

First World War
Shortly before the First World War he transferred to the Royal Flying Corps, becoming one of its first brigadier generals in 1917.

Charlton was initially as a flight commander on No. 3 Squadron and later as the first Officer Commanding of No. 8 Squadron. On 15 April 1915, when No. 8 Squadron was grouped with No. 13 Squadron to form RFC's new 5th Wing, Charlton temporarily took command until he travelled to France.

Iraq
On 2 February 1923, Air Commodore Charlton took up the post of Chief Staff Officer at the headquarters of the RAF's Iraq Command.  It was at this time that the RAF employed the bombing of Iraqi villages with the intent of pacifying tribal opposition.  Charlton opposed this policy and he went on to openly criticize such bombing actions. Within a year of his arrival, Charlton resigned from his post in Iraq. In the same month he arrived, Charlton visited the local hospital in Diwaniya, and was shocked by seeing the wounds of Iraqis injured in RAF bombing raids present, later writing in his memoirs that "indiscriminate bombing of a populace... with the liability of killing women and children, was the nearest thing to wanton slaughter."

On his return to Great Britain, Charlton expected to be summoned to see the Chief of the Air Staff, Hugh Trenchard. The summons never came.

Although Charlton was barred from further postings in Iraq, he went on to serve as Air Officer Commanding No 3 Group.  Charlton requested early retirement, which he was granted.

Later life
In retirement, he became an author of adventure fiction for children. At this time he also wrote Charlton, an autobiography, published by Penguin Books (no. 163, 1938); this work was rather candid and was written in the third person singular. In 1938, he published The Air Defence of Britain, a reasoned analysis and prediction of the impending Second World War, correctly emphasizing the crucial importance which bombing civilian populations would have. Charlton was homosexual and lived with an old RAF friend, Tom Wichelo; he belonged to a circle including Edward Morgan Forster, Joe Ackerley, Raymond Mortimer and John Gielgud.

Legacy
In recent years, the memory of Charlton was taken up by opponents of the present war in Iraq, and specifically by British opponents of their country's involvement in that war, who hold him up as an example to be emulated by present-day officers.

Commentator Mike Marqusee in The Guardian expressed the opinion that Charlton should have had a monument erected in his honour at London, rather than his fellow RAF commander Arthur "Bomber" Harris who conducted the bombings of Iraq without compunction and went on to bomb the German cities in World War II.

References

External links
Air of Authority – A History of RAF Organisation – Air Cdre Charlton
Dictionary of National Biography – Charlton, Lionel Evelyn Oswald (requires login)
Airminded – Air Power and British Society 1908 – 1939 – L E O Charlton

|-
 

|-

|-

|-

|-
 

|-
 

1879 births
1958 deaths
Royal Flying Corps officers
Lancashire Fusiliers officers
Royal Air Force generals of World War I
Military history of Iraq
Companions of the Distinguished Service Order
Companions of the Order of St Michael and St George
Companions of the Order of the Bath
Gay military personnel
English LGBT people
Officiers of the Légion d'honneur
20th-century British writers
Military personnel from London